The Kahler Tremolo System is an electric guitar bridge with a cam operated vibrato arm system. The original flat mount and stud mount models were invented and patented by Dave Storey and licensed to Gary Kahler. Gary Kahler shifted his business model to making Golf clubs in the 1990s (mostly due to lower popularity of tremolo use), but went back to bridge manufacturing as of April 2005. Dave Storey went on to invent, patent, and manufacture his line of Dava guitar picks.

Models and varieties
Cams and saddles are available in several different types, including brass and stainless steel. Stainless steel models were introduced in 1985. Aluminium cams were announced in 2004 and released in 2005. The 2310, their current OEM model, is the only tremolo to offer the aluminum cam - though parts are interchangeable - and offers brass rollers. Steel rollers can also be used.

Kahler also produces a bass tremolo system.  The first two bridges Kahler sold after their return in 2005 were 2410 bass tremolos.

Guitars that have carved tops (as opposed to flat, like the Fender Stratocaster), such as the Gibson Les Paul, cannot properly mount the 2300 series of Kahler tremolo, and instead have to use a stud-mounted 2200 series.

For a period spanning from the mid-1980s to the time when Kahler ceased production in the early 1990s, Kahler also produced fulcrum-based systems similar to the Floyd Rose brand of tremolos. The 2600 "Steeler" tremolo was licensed to Kahler by Floyd Rose during the late-1980s. The 2500 and 2520 (the former having steel rollers; the latter brass), were designed as an alternative to the stock Fender tremolo system, and were offered on several Fenders during the 1980s. Today, Kahler no longer produces fulcrum-based tremolos.

Neal Moser offers Kahler bridges on many models, and the Jackson and ESP Custom Shops currently offer Kahlers as a custom option. ESP and B.C. Rich also offer the Kahler X-TREM on their more affordable signature models for Jeff Hanneman and Kerry King respectively. ESP and B.C. Rich offer the Kahler Hybrid model on their mid-range guitars such as LTD JH-600 and B.C. Rich Wartribe, both with EMG pickups. Gibson has included the Kahler system on limited edition guitars such as the Gibson Shred-X Explorer and the Gibson Tribal Explorer. Peavey's PXD Void III and Twenty-Three III guitars also feature the Kahler system. Because they are suitable for left handed as well as right handed guitars, Gaskell Guitars offers all Kahler models on their custom left handed guitar builds.

References

External links
Official website

Guitar bridges